Claudio Noce (born 1 August 1975) is an Italian film director and screenwriter.

Career
In 2005 he won the David di Donatello for Best Short Film for Aria. His feature film directorial debut Good Morning Aman was presented at the International Critics' Week of the 66th Venice Film Festival. His subsequent film The Ice Forest (2014) premiered at the Rome Film Festival. His third feature film, Padrenostro, was selected in competition at the 77th Venice Film Festival.

Filmography

Films

Television

References

External links
 

1975 births
Living people
Film directors from Rome
Italian male screenwriters
David di Donatello winners